Mantz is a German surname. Notable people with this surname include:

Paul Mantz, noted air racing pilot.
Johnny Mantz, American racecar driver.
Baltus Mantz, American politician.
Carl W. Mantz, Republican representative of Pennsylvania.
Felix Manz, also known as Felix Mantz, co-founder of the original Swiss Brethren Anabaptist congregation.

German-language surnames